This is a list of episodes for the BBC2 game show Shooting Stars hosted by Vic Reeves and Bob Mortimer.

The two teams are referred to as Team A and Team B, with the exception of the pilot episode (where they were referred to as the Starbirds and the Helicopters). Mark Lamarr was team A's captain for the first three series, after which Will Self took over. From the 2008 Anniversary Special, comedian Jack Dee became captain of team A.

Ulrika Jonsson has been team B's captain for the programme's entire run, with the exceptions of the pilot episode (in which Jonsson appeared as a guest) and a 2002 special, where Sara Cox assumed the captaincy due to illness, Jonsson did appear in a pre-recorded sketch used in the special.

In series 4 and 5 Johnny Vegas was a permanent panelist on team B, and Angelos Epithemiou (played by comedian Dan Skinner), appeared in the same capacity in series 6 before replacing George Dawes (played by Matt Lucas) as scorekeeper thereafter.

Contestants whose names are written in bold undertook the show's final challenge, unless otherwise stated.

Episode list
As of 12 September 2011, 72 episodes of the show have been broadcast, not including the exclusive-to-video episode.

The coloured backgrounds denote the result of each of the shows:
 – indicates Starbirds/Team A won.
 – indicates Helicopters/Team B won.
 – indicates the game ended in a draw

Pilot

Series 1

Series 2

Unviewed and Nude

Series 3

Series 4

Series 5

Anniversary Specials

Series 6

Series 7

Series 8

Scores

Notes

External links
List of Shooting Stars episodes at the British Comedy Guide

Lists of British comedy television series episodes
Lists of British non-fiction television series episodes